Francisco Hernan Fonseca Lira (born 24 March 1994) is a Nicaraguan professional boxer. He has challenged twice for the IBF super featherweight title in 2017 and 2018.

Professional career
Fonseca turned professional in December 2013 in San Jose, Costa Rica. On his debut as a professional, Fonseca faced Eduardo Urbina. The match ended in a draw.

Fonseca fought on the undercard in a super featherweight bout with undefeated IBF champion Gervonta Davis on the 26 August 2017 mega fight between Floyd Mayweather Jr. and Conor McGregor. Davis failed to make weight, therefore the fight continued without the belt on the line for Davis. Fonseca lost the fight via eighth-round knockout, the first loss of his professional career.

On 15 December 2018, Fonseca made his second challenge for the IBF super featherweight title, now held by Tevin Farmer, on the undercard of Canelo Álvarez vs. Rocky Fielding. Fonseca was once against unsuccessful, losing by unanimous decision with all three judges scoring the bout 117–111 in favor of Farmer.

On 16 November 2019, Fonseca travelled to London, England to face Alex Dilmaghani for the vacant IBO super featherweight title. After the 12 rounds, the bout ended in a majority draw, meaning that neither fighter won the IBO title.

In his following fight, Fonseca faced undefeated prospect Ryan García at the Honda Center, California on 14 February 2020. Fonseca suffered the second knockout defeat of his career, after being knocked out by García in just 80 seconds of the first round.

Professional boxing record

References

External links
 

1994 births
Living people
Costa Rican male boxers
Super-featherweight boxers
People from San Ramón, Costa Rica
Nicaraguan emigrants to Costa Rica
Lightweight boxers